The following lists events that happened during 1847 in New Zealand.

Population
The estimated population of New Zealand at the end of 1847 is 69,700 Māori and 14,477 non-Māori.

Incumbents

Regal and viceregal
Head of State – Queen Victoria
Governor – Sir George Grey

Government and law
Chief Justice – William Martin

Events 
5 August – The Ramilles arrives in Auckland with the first fencibles. They are initially housed at the Auckland Barracks.
15 September – The first hospital in Wellington is opened in Thorndon.
17 November – The first fencibles move to Onehunga.

Undated
The first permanent hospital in Auckland opens in Grafton Gully.

Births
 January 5: William Rose Bock, engraver, medallist, illuminator, stamp designer, lithographer and publisher (d. 1932)
 (unknown date, place): Charles King, cricketer (d. 1917)

Deaths
 12 March: Te Manihera Poutama, missionary
 5 April: George Binns, chartist leader and poet
 19 July (in Tasmania): Hohepa Te Umuroa, political prisoner
 1 September: Tiakitai, tribal leader and trader

Unknown date
Dicky Barrett, whaler and trader
Tuhuru Kokare, tribal leader

See also
List of years in New Zealand
Timeline of New Zealand history
History of New Zealand
Military history of New Zealand
Timeline of the New Zealand environment
Timeline of New Zealand's links with Antarctica

References

External links